Samir Benamar (born 23 August 1992) is a Moroccan footballer.

Career

FC Gießen
On 2 November 2019, Benamar joined FC Gießen after having been without club since the summer 2018.

References

External links
 

Moroccan footballers
German footballers
Association football midfielders
TuS Koblenz players
FC Rot-Weiß Erfurt players
Arminia Bielefeld players
FC Gießen players
Difaâ Hassani El Jadidi players
3. Liga players
Regionalliga players
German people of Moroccan descent
People from Nador
1992 births
Living people